Supayalat (13 December 1859 – 24 November 1925), also spelt Suphayalat, was the last queen of Burma who reigned in Mandalay (1878–1885), born to King Mindon Min and Queen of Alenandaw (also known as Hsinbyumashin or Lady of the White Elephant). The British corruption of her name was "Soup Plate". She was married to her half-brother, Thibaw, who became the last king of the Konbaung dynasty in 1878, upon Mindon Min's death. She is best known for engineering a massacre of 80 to 100 royal family members, to prevent potential rivals from usurping Thibaw's power, although she had always denied any knowledge of the plot, which may have been hatched by her mother together with some of the ministers, including the chancellor Kinwon Min Gyi U Kaung. U Kaung had traveled around the world and seen for himself the power of the British military. When U Kaung pleaded to the King Thibaw at the Royal court that the kingdom should not go to war with the British, Supayalat angrily says,

King Thibaw was known for his reliance on Supayalat. Although Thibaw was king, many historians say it was Supayalat who actually ruled the country. The bloody coup that brought her and Thibaw to power associated her name with cruelty, brutality and barbarity. As a greatest achievement of Supayalat, she changed the royal tradition of polygamy to monogamy on a Burmese king for the first and the last time in history and never allowed her Thibaw to take another woman as a consort.

Early life
Supayalat was born on 13 December 1859 at the Royal Palace, in Mandalay as Hteik Supayalat, was the second of three daughters of King Mindon and Hsinbyumashin. She was a full-blooded sister of Supayagyi and Supayalay. She received the appanage of Tabayin,  and later Myadaung was therefore known as the Princess of Myadaung, with the royal title of Sīri Suriya Prabha Ratanā Devī.

Self-anointed queen

The three other queens of Mindon had no children, and Hsinbyumashin became more powerful after the death of the chief queen Setkya Dewi. Thibaw, on the other hand, was the son of a middle-ranking queen, Laungshe Mibaya. He was however learned in the Buddhist scriptures and also educated by the missionary Dr Marks, and became one of Mindon's favourite sons.

In 1878, Thibaw succeeded his father in a bloody succession massacre. Hsinbyumashin, one of Mindon's queens, had grown dominant at the Mandalay court during Mindon's final days. Under the guise that Mindon wanted to bid his children (other princes and princesses) farewell, Hsinbyumashin had all royals of close age (who could potentially be heir to the throne) mercilessly slaughtered by edict, to ensure that Thibaw and her daughter Supayalat would assume the throne. Many historians and media accused Supayalat also engineered merciless massacre but she denied.

The ambitious Hsinbyumashin, after putting him on the throne, offered her oldest daughter Hteik Supayagyi, Princess of Mong Nawng to be his queen, but during the royal wedding ceremony Supayalat pushed in next to her sister to be anointed queen at the same time, breaking ancient custom. Her sister's marriage was never consummated, and Supayalat was said to have forced monogamy on a Burmese king for the first and the last time in history, even though Thibaw also subsequently married her youngest sister Hteik Supayalay, Princess of Yamethin. Supayalat was only 19 and Thibaw 20 when they ascended the lion throne (Thihathana palin).

Exile

Their reign lasted just seven years when Thibaw Min was defeated in the Third Anglo-Burmese War and forced to abdicate by the British in 1885. On 25 November 1885 they were taken away in a covered carriage, leaving Mandalay Palace by the southern gate of the walled city along the streets lined by British soldiers and their wailing subjects, to the River Irrawaddy where a steamboat called Thuriya (Sun) awaited. Thibaw was 27 and Supayalat 26.

Supayalat never lost her composure, and was said to have asked a British soldier by the wayside for a light to smoke a Burmese cheroot. She was pregnant and accompanied by her husband, their two daughters, her two sisters, and her mother; the rest of their party followed on foot. The troops had nicknamed her "Soup Plate", and in the commotion and haste that attended their abduction, some of the crown jewels disappeared including a large ruby called Nga Mauk that Colonel Sladen had insisted on being handed over for safekeeping.  Thibaw saw an opportunity in 1911 when King George V visited India, and wrote for the return of the Burmese crown jewels, but only received a reply that Col. Sladen had died in 1890. Nga Mauk was believed to have subsequently turned up as the largest ruby on the British crown; it was recognised by  Princess of Kyundaung in whose charge the ruby used to be.

On 10 December 1885 the royal family, minus the queen mother and Supayagyi who were sent to Dawei, was taken to Madras where their third daughter was born, and in April the next year they were moved to Ratnagiri on the west coast where they could no longer look across the Bay of Bengal to the land they had been forced to leave. Supayalat gave birth to her fourth and youngest daughter in 1887; they were not given a proper residence commensurate with their status until 1911 when Thibaw Palace was built by the government. In 1914 the royal princesses had an ear-piercing ceremony ( nahtwin mingala) according to Burmese custom. Some of the family members, court officials and entertainers including the famous orchestra of Sein Beida and the harpist Deiwa Einda Maung Maung Gyi from Burma were permitted to attend the ceremony. Although Supayalat's first born was a boy he did not survive infancy, and she had also lost another daughter.

The royal princesses were named as follows:
 Hteiksu Myat Phaya Gyi (1880–1947) married an Indian door guard at Thibaw Palace. She had a daughter named Tu Tu.
 Hteiksu Myat Phaya Lat (1882–1956) married a Burmese courtier Khin Maung Lat; neither of these unions met with the royal parents' approval.
 Hteiksu Myat Phaya aka Madras Supaya (1886–1962) returned to Burma with her mother, and married a grandson of Kanaung Mintha, her great uncle and brother of King Mindon.
 Hteiksu Myat Phaya Galay (1887–1935), the youngest and brightest, was fluent in English and acted as the royal family's spokesperson airing their grievances in a document called Sadutta thamidaw ayeidawbon sadan ( The Fourth Royal Daughter Crisis Document); she was sent away by the colonial government to live in Moulmein where she spent the rest of her days.

Return
Supayagyi, who had remained childless, looked after her four royal nieces, and died in 1912. When King Thibaw died in 1916 at the age of 58 after 30 years in exile, Supayalat fought in vain for the right to take her husband's body back to be buried with proper funeral rites in Burma. She refused to give up the bodies of both her sister and her husband, buried in the grounds of their palace, to the authorities who eventually took them by force to be buried in Ratnagiri in 1919. The queen did not attend the funeral although she did send two of the royal princesses to the ceremony. The tombs of the king and Supayalay were later joined by that of Pahtama thamidaw (First Royal Daughter) who died in 1947.

Supayalat returned to Rangoon in 1919, confining her under house arrest. She was never allowed to leave her home, which was under constant observation by the police. She had lived on a pension and in her last days her closest adviser was Thakin Kodaw Hmaing, the great writer and nationalist leader, who revered her for her defiant stand against colonialism and who had witnessed at the age of nine the fall of the monarchy and the abduction of the royal couple in Mandalay.

At the time of her return to Burma, the country was in the grip of nationalist fervor. She became a focus of anti-colonial and nationalist sentiment. Hmaing founded the Protection Committee for the Queen, with other nationalists. The committee pressed the British government to improve Suphayalat's living conditions and provide her with a small allowance. Hmaing was a boarder at Myadaung Monastery built by the queen who never had the chance to conduct an opening ceremony (yeizetcha, literally "pour drops of water", in order to call on the goddess of earth to witness the good deed) as it had only been recently completed.

Supayalat disdained British rule to the end, never regarded herself as beholden to the British who she believed robbed her of her kingdom with all the wealth and riches therein. She shunned British products and any association with her country's colonial rulers. She only a few British visitors were welcomed into her presence—among them, the British author Noel Whiting, who sympathized with the Burmese nationalist cause.

She died six years later, in 1925, shortly before her 66th birthday. Although the colonial government declared the day of her funeral a national holiday, the royal family's request for her to be buried in Mandalay was also refused. Her funeral was, however, held with pomp and ceremony as befitted a Burmese queen, organised by the Saophas of Yaunghwe and Thibaw. Her body lay in state, shielded under eight white royal umbrellas, attended by 90 Buddhist monks and the British governor Sir Harcourt Butler with a guard of honour of the Mounted Police complete with a 30 gun salute.

Supayalat lies buried at Kandawmin Garden Mausolea near the Shwedagon Pagoda between the tombs of Khin Kyi, mother of State Counsellor Daw Aung San Suu Kyi, and the former UN secretary general U Thant.

In popular culture

Literature
 The Lacquer Lady - a novel by F. Tennyson Jesse
 The Glass Palace - a novel by Amitav Ghosh
 The City of Gem - a novel by Joanna Trollope
 Mandalay - a poem by Rudyard Kipling

Films
Portrayed by Tussaneeya Karnsomnut in 2017 Thai soap opera Plerng Phra Nang was loosely based on Supayalat's life and some Burmese cultures and traditions are used in drama
Portrayed by Patcharin Judrabounpol in 2017 Thai television drama Rak Nakara
Portrayed by Cho Thin in 1997 film Never Shall We Be Enslaved.
Mentioned in the 2018 romance/comedy drama film Crazy Rich Asians, where her jewellery was bought by Astrid.
Portrayed by Pimpan Chalaikupp in 2022 Thai horror television drama Lay Luntaya  mainly based on Supayalat's life the story setting in fictional city based on Mandalay

References

External links
Thibaw's Queen by H Fielding-Hall (1899) Internet Archive, Canadian Libraries
Mandalay  in 1878-1879 - the letters of James Alfred Colbeck SOAS
Mandalay in 1885-1888 - the letters of James Alfred Colbeck SOAS
 SOAS

1859 births
1925 deaths
Burmese Buddhists
Chief queens consort of Konbaung dynasty